Asplenium trichomanes, the maidenhair spleenwort, is a small fern in the spleenwort genus Asplenium. It is a widespread and common species, occurring almost worldwide in a variety of rocky habitats. It is a variable fern with several subspecies.

The specific epithet trichomanes refers to a Greek word for fern.

Description
Asplenium trichomanes grows  10 to 30 cm tall forming tufts arising from a short, scaly rhizome. The scales are dark.  The evergreen fronds are long and narrow, gradually tapering towards the tip. They are simply divided into small, yellow-green to dark-green, roundish pinnae. The stipe and rachis of the frond are dark all along their length. The fronds can reach 40 cm in length but are more commonly 8–20 cm. The indusia are linear to oval, straight, and attached to the upper-side of the fertile vein. There are (2) 4 to 8 sori per pinna and each are 1 to 3.5 mm long. Diploid (2n) chromosome count is 72.

Distribution and habitat
It is widespread in temperate and subarctic areas and also occurs in mountainous regions in the tropics. Its range includes most of Europe and much of Asia south to Turkey, Iran and the Himalayas with a population in Yemen. It occurs in northern, southern and parts of eastern Africa and also in eastern Indonesia, south-east Australia, Tasmania, New Zealand and Hawaii. It is found in North America and Central America and Cuba, and the northern and western regions of South America such as Chile. Even though its range is wide spread, it is often rare, and populations are widely spread out from each other based on the available of suitable habitat.

It grows in rocky habitats such as cliffs, scree slopes, walls and mine waste, the type of rock used as a substrate depending on the subspecies. It grows from sea-level up to 3000 metres in North America while in the British Isles it reaches 870 metres.

In the US state of Minnesota A. trichomanes is listed as a threatened species. It occurs on ledges and in crevices on moist, east-facing cliffs and occasionally on talus with similar conditions. The Minnesota populations are Asplenium trichomanes subsp. trichomanes.

Cultivation
Asplenium trichomanes is valued in cultivation for its hardiness (down to ), its evergreen foliage and its ability to colonise crevices in stone walls. It prefers a fully or partially shaded aspect. It has gained the Royal Horticultural Society’s Award of Garden Merit.

Taxonomy
Linnaeus was the first to describe maidenhair spleenwort with the binomial Asplenium trichomanes in his Species Plantarum of 1753.

Asplenium trichomanes has diploid, tetraploid and hexaploid cytotypes, which it has been argued should be recognised as distinct species. A triploid cytotype (a sterile hybrid between the diploid and tetraploid cytotype) is also known. Within these cytotypes several subspecies are recognised, including

Asplenium trichomanes subsp. trichomanes prefers acidic rocks such as sandstone, basalt and granite. In Europe and North America it is most often found in mountainous areas and is commonest in the north. It is a delicate plant with a slender stipe and rachis and relatively few pinnae. Diploid.
Asplenium trichomanes subsp. quadrivalens prefers calcareous rocks such as limestone and dolomite and often grows on the mortar in walls. It is commoner than A. t. subsp. trichomanes in much of Europe but is less widespread in North America, although it is present in southern North America where ssp. trichomanes is absent. Compared to the nominate subspecies it is stouter and has more pinnae which are more square in shape and have less of a stalk. The fronds tend to grow close to the rock while those of A. t. subsp. trichomanes tend to arch away. Tetraploid.
Asplenium trichomanes subsp. pachyrachis (syn. Asplenium csikii) is mainly found on limestone rocks and walls. It is small and delicate, grows close to the rock and has a rigid, fragile stipe and rachis. Tetraploid.
Asplenium trichomanes subsp. coriaceifolium (syn. Asplenium azomanes): Majorca, Spain, Morocco. Tetraploid.
Asplenium trichomanes subsp. hastatum. Tetraploid.
Asplenium trichomanes subsp. inexpectans. Diploid.
Asplenium trichomanes subsp. maderense. Madeira, Azores. Hexaploid. Hexaploids also occur in Australia and New Zealand.
Asplenium trichomanes nothosubsp. staufferi. Tetraploid (pachyrachis × quadrivalens).
Asplenium trichomanes nothosubsp. barraraense. Tetraploid (coraceifolium × quadrivalens).
Asplenium trichomanes nothosubsp. lovisianum. Tetraploid (hastatum × quadrivalens).
Asplenium trichomanes nothosubsp. moravicum. Tetraploid (hastatum × pachyrachis).
Asplenium trichomanes nothosubsp. melzeranum. Triploid (hastatum × inexpectans).
Asplenium trichomanes nothosubsp. melzeri. Triploid (quadrivalens × inexpectans).
Asplenium trichomanes nothosubsp. tadei-reichsteinii. Triploid (pachyrachis × inexpectans).
Asplenium trichomanes nothosubsp. lusaticum. Triploid (trichomanes × quadrivalens).
Asplenium trichomanes nothosubsp. malacitense. Triploid (coraceifolium × inexpectans).

References

Flora of North America. Asplenium trichomanes. Accessed 13 August 2008.
Hutchinson, G. (1996) Welsh Ferns, National Museums and Galleries of Wales.
Page C. N. (1982) The Ferns of Britain and Ireland, Cambridge University Press.
Preston, C. D. & Pearman, D. A. (2002) New Atlas of the British and Irish Flora, Oxford University Press.
Stace, Clive A. (1997) New Flora of the British Isles, Cambridge University Press.
Tutin, T. G. et al. (1964) Flora Europaea, Volume 1. Cambridge University Press.

External links

BSBI Maps: Distribution in Britain and Ireland
Plants for a Future database
Flora of Pennsylvania

trichomanes
Ferns of the Americas
Ferns of Asia
Ferns of Europe
Ferns of Australasia
Ferns of the United States
Alpine flora
Tropical flora
Flora of Central America
Flora of South America
Flora of Australasia
Flora of Asia
Flora of Australia
Plants described in 1753
Taxa named by Carl Linnaeus